The Carmes Prison (French - prison des Carmes) was a prison of the French Revolution. It was set up in what had been the Carmes Monastery in Paris. It formed a vast enclosure bounded by rue du Regard, rue du Cherche-Midi and rue Cassette - it was also bordered to the south by rue de Vaugirard. It was the site of one of the September Massacres in 1792 and features in the 1927 film Napoléon.

September Martyrs

History

The Civil Constitution of the Clergy was adopted on 12 July 1790, setting up a new system for electing priests and bishops and allowing a death sentence against any priests who refused to comply. 126 of 130 bishops and 100,000 out of 130,000 priests refused to swear to it and so on 27 May 1792 a decree of the Legislative Assembly ordered them to be deported.

The monastery's household silver and library were seized and the community was forced to leave the monastery building, which was turned into a prison. 188 priests and three bishops were massacred in particularly violent conditions under commissioner Stanislas-Marie Maillard, who executed orders from the surveillance committee. At the Abbaye Prison the violence lasted until the end of the morning of 4 September, with 21 priests and 151 others killed out of a total of 29 priests and 209 other prisoners - at Carmes it only ended at 6pm, with 116 killed out of between 162 and 172 prisoners. All the monks who refused to take the oath before the tribunal at the prison were bayoneted or impaled on pikes on the threshold. The massacre at Carmes lasted all night.

Jean Marie du Lau d'Allemans (archbishop of Arles), his vicar general Armand de Foucauld de Pontbriand,  (bishop of Beauvais) and his brother  (bishop of Saintes) were shut up in the monastery church and between 2 and 5 September all three of them were killed in the monastery garden along with the priests André Grasset, Ambroise Chevreux,  and Joseph-Marie Gros.

Bibliography
  Gérard Cholvy (editor), Un évêque dans la tourmente révolutionnaire, Jean Marie du Lau, archevêque d'Arles, et ses compagnons martyrs, 1792-1992, colloque du IIe centenaire tenu à Arles les 2-4 octobre 1992, Montpellier, Université Paul Valéry, 1995.

References

External links 
  Account of the Carmes massacre by abbé Berthelet de Barbot

Religion and the French Revolution
Prisons in Paris
Persecution of Catholics